Pennsylvania Route 351 (PA 351) is a  state highway located in Lawrence and Beaver counties in Pennsylvania.  The western terminus is at the Ohio border in Little Beaver Township (just south of S.N.P.J).  The eastern terminus is at PA 65/PA 288 in Ellwood City. It is famous for its spotting of Raymond Robinson (Green Man) who would go on nighttime walks on the route making him an Urban legend.

Route description

PA 351 begins at the Ohio border in Little Beaver Township, Lawrence County, where the road continues into Ohio as SR 617. From the state line, the route heads southeast on a two-lane undivided road, heading through open agricultural areas with some woods and homes. The road turns to the east-southeast and continues through more rural areas, crossing the North Fork Little Beaver Creek and reaching an intersection with PA 551. At this point, PA 351 forms a concurrency with PA 551, heading through more areas of farms, woods, and residences as it passes through Old Enon. The road heads into the borough of Enon Valley and becomes State Street, heading into residential areas and merging onto Main Street. PA 351 splits from PA 551 by turning east onto Vine Street, heading into agricultural areas and crossing back into Little Beaver Township, where it becomes an unnamed road. The road passes over Norfolk Southern's Fort Wayne Line and turns to the south, heading into wooded areas with some homes.

PA 351 enters Darlington Township in Beaver County and becomes Crescent Drive, turning southeast into a mix of farmland and woodland with some homes. The route crosses the North Fork Little Beaver Creek again and heads into more wooded areas, crossing into the borough of Big Beaver. The road turns south near more fields and heads into the borough of New Galilee, becoming Cleveland Drive and curving southwest past homes. PA 351 turns northeast onto Cleveland Street Extended before turning east onto Monroe Street, crossing Norfolk Southern's Fort Wayne Line. The route passes more homes before intersecting PA 168 and turning south to join that route on Centennial Avenue. PA 351 splits from PA 168 by turning east onto Fairlane Boulevard, crossing back into Big Beaver. The road turns to the northeast through woodland, coming to a bridge over the Pennsylvania Turnpike (Interstate 76, I-76). From here, the route turns northeast through a mix of farms and woods with some homes, crossing over I-376. A short distance later, PA 351 comes to an intersection with Shenango Road, which provides access to both I-76 and I-376. Past this, the road passes a few fields and homes before continuing southeast through more forested areas. The route turns east through wooded areas of homes before coming to a junction with PA 18. At this intersection, PA 351 crosses into the borough of Koppel and becomes Arthur Street, passing residences and businesses. The route crosses Norfolk Southern's Koppel Secondary railroad line and turns north onto 5th Avenue, heading past more development. The road curves northeast and passes near industry, crossing under a CSX railroad line before becoming unnamed and heading northeast through woodland. PA 351 comes to the Koppel Bridge that crosses over CSX's Pittsburgh Subdivision rail line before passing over the Beaver River into North Sewickley Township and heading over Norfolk Southern's Youngstown Line and another CSX railroad line. Past the bridge, the route turns north onto River Road and heads through wooded areas with some commercial development.

PA 351 heads into Wayne Township in Lawrence County and becomes West Lawrence Avenue, turning northeast and running through the residential community of Park Gate. The road heads into the borough of Ellwood City and turns to the east, becoming Lawrence Avenue and passing through business areas. Farther east, the route heads through the commercial downtown before turning south onto 4th Street. A block later, PA 351 turns east onto Crescent Avenue and passes homes before ending at PA 65/PA 288.

History

PA 351 was signed in 1926, running from the Ohio state line to PA 451 New Galilee.  In 1936, PA 451 was decommissioned, allowing PA 351 to extend its eastern segment to PA 18 in Koppel.  Later that same year, PA 351 was extended one last time to its current eastern terminus at PA 65/PA 288 in Ellwood City.

Major intersections

Special Routes

Former Koppel truck route

Pennsylvania Route 351 Truck was a truck route that bypassed the weight-restricted Koppel Bridge that carried the route over the Beaver River and CSX and Norfolk Southern railroad lines in Koppel, on which trucks over 31 tons were prohibited. The route followed PA 18, PA 588, PA 65, and PA 65/288. PA 351 Truck was signed in 2013. The bridge was completely reconstructed in 2019, and the route was removed.

Ellwood City truck route

Pennsylvania Route 351 Truck is a truck route that bypasses a portion of PA 351 in Ellwood City. The truck route follows the one-way pair of 5th Street north in the eastbound direction and Spring Avenue west and 6th Street south in the westbound direction before both directions head north along 5th Street and then east and south along PA 65/PA 288. The route was signed in 2013.

See also

Raymond Robinson (Green Man)

References

External links

Pennsylvania Highways: PA 351

351
Transportation in Lawrence County, Pennsylvania
Transportation in Beaver County, Pennsylvania